Lake Moro is a lake in the Province of Brescia, Lombardy, Italy. At an elevation of 380 m, its surface area is 0.174 km².

Lakes of Lombardy